Haridwar railway station (Station code: HW), is one of the major railway stations in Haridwar district, Uttarakhand, India. It falls under the Moradabad division of the Northern Railway zone of the Indian Railways.

Overview

The station is situated on the Laksar–Dehradun railway line for connecting Delhi, Howrah and rest of India. One of the main railheads of the Northern Railway zone, Haridwar Junction railway station is connected by broad-gauge lines. The station is situated on the NH 58 in the Devpura locality of Haridwar. The nearby station of Rishikesh is connected to Haridwar on a branch line. Towards west, the major railhead is at Saharanpur (76 km) and going north, the major railhead is at Dehradun (52 km).

Location

The railway station is located on the south side of the town, within walking distance of most hotels. A tourist information center is provided by the railway department to help travelers. Computerized reservation facility is offered. In front of the railway station is the UTC Roadways Bus Station of Haridwar  offering regular services to places in and around Haridwar such as Delhi and to all major destinations in North India including Mussoorie, Meerut, Saharanpur, Ghaziabad, Kanpur, Lucknow, Bareilly, Shimla, Dehradun, Badrinath, Nainital, Ranikhet and Uttarkashi. Nearest airport is Jolly Grant Airport located about (42 km) in Dehradun.The station is also one of the major rail-heads to the famous pilgrimage "Char-Dham" and other tourist stations. Haridwar is considered one of the seven holy cities of Hinduism in India and it is continuing to expand and thrive with spiritual centres,educational Institutions and has witnessed great demographic flow.

Infrastructure and amenities

Haridwar Railway Station has recently been renovated with retiring room and waiting halls. The station has also been provided with new escalators and lifts in order to facilitate passengers, especially senior citizens, disabled people, women, and child travellers. Additional facilities like pay and use toilet, coach guidance system from platform 1 to platform 4 has been installed. Security system has been upgraded in the station with Indian Railways providing new Railway Protection Force (RPF) and GRP (Government Railway Police) stations which will serve as prompt emergency centre for security needs as well as for reporting crimes in addition to providing comfort and conveniences to the security forces. As Haridwar has large foot fall throughout the year and hence CCTV surveillance has been upgraded which provides close watch and strengthen security at the station. Northern Railway zone has also been modernising works including washable aprons for coach maintenance, improvements to parking and circulating area, provision of foot-over-bridges, providing second entry, facade lighting with provision of LED lighting, station building improvements with allied works like improvements to platform surface, PF shelters.

References

External links
 Official Website of the Northern Railway Zone
 India rail info: Map of Haridwar Junction railway station

Railway stations in Haridwar district
Moradabad railway division
Railway stations in India opened in 1886
Buildings and structures in Haridwar
Transport in Haridwar
Railway junction stations in Uttarakhand
Indian Railway A1 Category Stations